Marino railway station is located on the Seaford line. Situated in the southern Adelaide suburb of Marino, it is 18.3 kilometres from Adelaide station.

In addition to serving the hillside Marino community, the station provides the rest of Adelaide with public transport access to a host of local amenities such as the Marino Community Hall (20M) and the Historic Kingston House (500M). The sporting clubs Seacliff Hockey Club & Seacliff Tennis Club are also within walking distance from the station (800M). Brighton Caravan Park (750M) is a popular beachside Caravan and Campground within 10 minutes walk from the Station.

History

Marino was opened in 1913 as the terminus of the Seaford line, until it was extended further south.

The current shelter was built during the duplication of the line between Oaklands and Hallett Cove Beach in 1975. The station did have a ticket office but it has since closed.

Services by platform

References

External links

Railway stations in Adelaide
Railway stations in Australia opened in 1915